Margaret Adele Parker-Koscik (born 30 June 1949) is an Australian former track and field athlete who competed in the javelin throw.

She emerged as a junior at national level in the mid-1960s, coming second at the national junior championships in 1964, then returning to win in 1965. At senior level she was twice runner-up at the Australian Athletics Championships, first in 1965 then again in 1971.

Parker's sole major international achievement was a gold medal at the 1966 British Empire and Commonwealth Games held in Kingston, Jamaica. She defeated former champion and fellow Australian Anna Pazera in the final, throwing the spear  to top the podium.

She married fellow Australian athlete Sig Koscik in 1972.

References

Living people
1949 births
Sportswomen from New South Wales
Australian female javelin throwers
Commonwealth Games gold medallists for Australia
Commonwealth Games medallists in athletics
Athletes (track and field) at the 1966 British Empire and Commonwealth Games
Medallists at the 1966 British Empire and Commonwealth Games